Zhelannaya Mountain is a relatively isolated mountain about 9 miles (14 km) north of Mount Karpinskiy in the Russkiye Mountains, Queen Maud Land. Mapped by the Soviet Antarctic Expedition of 1959 and named "Gora Zhelannaya" (desired mountain).

Mountains of Queen Maud Land
Princess Astrid Coast